Mary-Kate Olsen (born June 13, 1986) is an American businesswoman, fashion designer, equestrian, and former actress. She began her acting career nine months after her birth, sharing the role of Michelle Tanner with her twin sister Ashley Olsen in the television sitcom Full House (1987–1995). They also starred in numerous films together.

In 1993, the production company Dualstar Entertainment Group was founded, which produced a long string of television films and direct-to-video releases featuring the girls; they starred in Passport to Paris (1999), Our Lips Are Sealed (2000), Winning London (2001), Holiday in the Sun (2001) and in the television series, So Little Time (2001–2002), for which she was nominated for a Daytime Emmy Award for Outstanding Performer in Children's Programming. They starred in Getting There (2002), When in Rome (2002), The Challenge (2003) and made cameos in Charlie's Angels: Full Throttle (2003). The last film she starred in with her twin sister was New York Minute (2004). She continued with her acting career independently, appearing with a few guest-star roles in films and television shows, and with her last film being Beastly (2011). 

In March 2012, both Mary-Kate and Ashley officially indicated their interest to retire as actresses in order to focus on their careers in the fashion industry. She and her twin sister co-founded luxury fashion brand The Row, lifestyle brand Elizabeth and James, and more affordable fashion lines Olsenboye and StyleMint. They are members of the Council of Fashion Designers of America.

Early life and education
Mary-Kate Olsen was born on June 13, 1986, in Sherman Oaks, California. She is the daughter of Jarnette "Jarnie" (née Jones; b. 1954), a personal manager, and David "Dave" Olsen, a real estate developer and mortgage banker. Along with her twin Ashley, she has an older brother Trent, a younger sister and actress Elizabeth, and two half-siblings Taylor and Jake (from her father's second marriage). Olsen's parents divorced in 1996. The twins and their siblings have Norwegian ancestry while their mother is of French, German and Italian ancestry.

Olsen attended the Campbell Hall School in Los Angeles. After graduating from Campbell Hall in 2004, Olsen and her twin sister went on to attend the Gallatin School of Individualized Study at New York University.

Acting career

Career beginnings
Olsen began her acting career at the age of nine months old when she and her twin sister, Ashley Olsen, were hired to share the role of Michelle Tanner on the popular television sitcom Full House (1987–1995). She starred alongside her twin sister in the films, To Grandmother's House We Go (1992), Double, Double, Toil and Trouble (1993), How the West Was Fun (1994), It Takes Two (1995), Billboard Dad (1998) and in the television series, Two of a Kind (1998–1999). In 1997, the Olsen twins guest starred in an episode of Sister, Sister, which starred twin actresses Tia Mowry and Tamera Mowry.

Dualstar

In 1993, following Mary-Kate and Ashley's success on Full House, a limited liability company, Dualstar Entertainment Group was created to produce Mary-Kate and Ashley-branded products. It produced a successful long string of TV movies and direct-to-video releases featuring the girls. They starred in Passport to Paris (1999), Switching Goals (1999),  Our Lips Are Sealed (2000), Winning London (2001), Holiday in the Sun (2001) and in the television series, So Little Time (2001–2002).

They became household names and popular figures in the preteen market during the late 1990s and early 2000s, with Mary-Kate's likeness seen in clothes, books, fragrances, magazines, movies, and posters, among others. There were fashion dolls of her made by Mattel from 2000 to 2005. They also starred in the films Getting There (2002), When in Rome (2002), The Challenge (2003) and made cameos in Charlie's Angels: Full Throttle (2003). In 2004, the twins appeared in their final and light-hearted romantic comedy film, New York Minute.

That same year upon their 18th birthday, both Mary-Kate and Ashley took control of Dualstar, becoming joint-CEOs and presidents of the company, which at the time had its merchandise being carried in over 3,000 stores in America and 5,300 stores worldwide.

These ventures, combined with an array of licensing deals for their names and likenesses, made Olsen wealthy at a young age. In 2004, Olsen's and her twin sister’s wealth was estimated at $137 million each.

Retirement
Olsen's first solo acting appearance was in the movie Factory Girl (2006). Her one short scene was ultimately cut from theatrical release, but was included on the film's Unrated version on DVD and Blu-ray.

In 2007, she had a recurring role on the television show, Weeds, and the twins said that if they became involved in movies together again, it would be as producers.

In 2008, Olsen made a guest appearance on the ABC comedy Samantha Who? as a self-destructive girl that Samantha tries to help. That same year, she also appeared in the film The Wackness. In 2011, Olsen appeared in the motion picture adaption of the Alex Flinn novel Beastly, which was her final acting project.

In March 2012, both Mary-Kate and Ashley indicated their interest to retire as actresses in order to focus on their careers in fashion. They felt that their futures were in fashion, not in acting and discussed wanting to open a store as one of their future fashion-based endeavors.

In 2015, it was announced that John Stamos signed on with Netflix to produce and co-star in Fuller House, a spin-off of Full House that would reunite the original cast members for a 13-episode series. However, in May of that year, Mary-Kate and Ashley originally announced that they will not reprise their role as Michelle Tanner. A month prior to the announcement, Nickelodeon acquired the rights to the twins' video library.

Net worth and influence
In 2007, Forbes ranked the twins jointly as the eleventh-richest women in entertainment, with an estimated combined net worth of $100 million.

Fashion career

Career beginnings
Following a high volume of public interest in their fashion choices, the Olsen twins began work in collaboration on a string of fashion lines available to the public. Starting as young girls, they started a clothing line in Wal-Mart stores across America for girls ages 4 to 14 as well as a beauty line called "Mary-Kate and Ashley: Real fashion for real girls".

In 2004, they made news by signing a pledge to allow all the workers that sew their line of clothing in Bangladesh full maternity leave. The National Labor Committee, which organized the pledge, later praised the twins for their commitment to worker rights.

Business
As adults, the Olsen twins have devoted much of their attention to the world of fashion. They head a designer fashion label, "The Row," as well as "Elizabeth and James", "Olsenboye", and "StyleMint" retail collections. The idea for The Row started as a personal project in 2005 when her twin sister, Ashley Olsen, challenged herself to create a perfect T-shirt. She tested the design on a variety of women of all body shapes and ages in an attempt to find a "commonality in fit and attitude."

In 2006, Mary-Kate and Ashley were tapped as the faces of the upscale fashion line Badgley Mischka. In 2008, they co-authored Influence, a book featuring interviews with fashion designers that have inspired the twins' fashion lines.

In 2011, Mary-Kate and Ashley collaborated with TOMS Shoes to design footwear for kids without shoes in more than 20 countries worldwide. That same year, the sisters designed an Olsenboye Change Purse and donated the money to "Pennies From Heaven".

In October 2012, the twins won the WSJ magazine Innovator of The Year Award.

In 2013, they released an Elizabeth and James perfume.

Mary-Kate's controversial fashion choices have often found her on both the best and worst dressed fashion lists, particularly for her decision to wear fur.

She and Ashley are members of the Council of Fashion Designers of America, CFDA a not-for-profit trade association of over 450 prominent American fashion and accessory designers. The twins are now the creative directors for Superga.

Equestrian career
Olsen began horseback riding in 1992 when she was six years old. During her time at Campbell Hall, she was a member of the school's equestrian team. After moving to New York in 2004 to attend NYU, Olsen temporarily quit riding, but she eventually started again, stating "I came back to the sport because I missed it every day that I wasn't riding. It was the hardest thing to leave and the hardest thing to come back to." In 2013, her horse Marvelous, ridden by James Anderson, won the 38th Hampton Classic Horse Show.

Olsen is a competitive equestrian. She began riding in the Hampton Classic Horse Show in Bridgehampton, New York in 2013. On September 17, 2016, she competed at The American Gold Cup in North Salem, New York. In August–September 2017, she competed at the Hampton Classic Horse Show: on August 29, Olsen and her horse Dunotaire V finished in sixth place in the amateur owner jumper (1.20 meter) event; and on September 1, she and Dunotaire V finished in third place in the amateur owner jumper classic event. In September 2017, Olsen and her horse Feu d'Amour won The American Gold Cup. She also has horses named Prem' Dollar Boy and Hertog Van't Merdehof.

In 2018, Olsen and Dunotaire V ranked 7 out of 40 in a category at the Palm Beach Masters in Wellington, Florida. In May 2019, Olsen competed at the Longines Global Champions Tour in Madrid, Spain; she and her horse Naomi finished in sixth place in their event, while she and her horse Fatum were disqualified from their event due to an "error of course". On July 12, 2019, Olsen and Fatum won a 1.25m two-phase showjumping class at the Longines Global Champions Tour in Chantilly, France. In September 2021, she competed at the Longines Global Champions Tour in Rome, Italy: on September 16, she and her horse Iowa Van Het Polderhof finished in second place in the 2 Phases Special event; and on September 18, Olsen and Dunotaire V finished in third place in an Against the Clock No Jump Off event.

Writings
In 2008, Mary-Kate and Ashley released their book Influence.

Personal life

Relationships
Olsen has dated David Katzenberg (son of DreamWorks cofounder Jeffrey Katzenberg), photographer Maxwell Snow, and artist Nate Lowman.

In May 2012, Olsen began a relationship with Olivier Sarközy de Nagy-Bocsa, half-brother of former French president Nicolas Sarkozy. In March 2014, photos were published showing Olsen wearing what appeared to be an engagement ring. Olsen and Sarkozy were married on November 27, 2015, at a private residence in New York City. On April 17, 2020, Olsen filed for divorce from Sarkozy. On May 13, she filed an emergency order to proceed despite delays due to the COVID-19 pandemic. The emergency order was denied a day later. On January 25, 2021, the divorce was finalized.

Health issues
In 2004, shortly after graduating from high school, Olsen announced she had entered treatment for anorexia nervosa. A Got Milk? advertisement featuring the twins was pulled following the announcement. On November 20, 2007, she was hospitalized for a reported kidney infection.

Death of Heath Ledger
Olsen was a close friend of late actor Heath Ledger. After discovering Ledger unconscious in his bed on January 22, 2008, his massage therapist called Olsen twice before contacting police. Olsen sent a private security guard to the scene.

Responding to a claim by an anonymous law enforcement official that she would not speak to federal investigators without a promise of legal immunity, Olsen's attorney Michael C. Miller said, "We have provided the government with relevant information including facts in the chronology of events surrounding Mr. Ledger's death and the fact that Ms. Olsen does not know the source of the drugs Mr. Ledger consumed".

Filmography

Awards and nominations

References

External links

 
 The Row

1986 births
Living people
20th-century American actresses
21st-century American actresses
21st-century American writers
21st-century American women writers
Actresses from Los Angeles
American child actresses
American fashion designers
American film actresses
American film producers
American people of English descent
American people of Norwegian descent
American television actresses
Fraternal twin actresses

New York University Gallatin School of Individualized Study alumni
Olsen family
People from Sherman Oaks, Los Angeles
American twins
Writers from Los Angeles
American female equestrians
American women film producers
Sarkozy family
American women fashion designers